was a Japanese samurai of the late Edo period. A hatamoto serving the Tokugawa shōgun, Yoshisuke was the birth brother of the Bakufu senior councilor Mizuno Tadakuni. Atobe was not known for his good relations with daimyōs, having once angered Date Yoshikuni, the powerful lord of Sendai in Mutsu Province by throwing him out of a highway lodging.

Atobe was appointed to the post of wakadoshiyori in 1868, and died roughly a year later.

His court title was Yamashiro no kami.

1799 births
1869 deaths
Hatamoto
Samurai
Meiji Restoration
Wakadoshiyori